Ufabulum is the eleventh album by Squarepusher, released on 15 May 2012. Squarepusher has stated that "It's music which is generated purely from programming. There's no live guitar or drums, there's nothing in it which is live, really." At the time of release, Squarepusher made several appearances in festivals across the world, including his first show in Brazil, at the Sónar Festival.

Reception

AllMusic gave the album a score of 4 out of 5, saying "The most striking aspect of Ufabulum is the sense that Jenkinson is building on top of foundations he laid himself. Where early Squarepusher records were notable for their innovative work with beat programming or infusion of organic instruments with electronic mayhem, the songs here seem to begin with that template of jittery beats and grow into dense compositions."

Track listing

Personnel
 Design – Nick Robertson
 Music, artwork (LED imagery) – Tom Jenkinson
 Photography – Donald Milne, Nick Robertson

Charts

References

2012 albums
Squarepusher albums